The  is Japanese aerial lift line in Yamanouchi, Nagano, operated by . The company also operates , in which the aerial lift runs. Opened in 1961, the line mainly transports skiers in winter, but also hikers in other seasons.

Basic data
System: Aerial tramway, 2 track cables and 2 haulage ropes
Distance: 
Vertical interval: 
Maximum gradient: 30°53′
Operational speed: 7.0 m/s
Passenger capacity per a cabin: 166
The largest in Japan.
Cabins: 2
Stations: 2
Duration of one-way trip: 8 minutes

See also
List of aerial lifts in Japan

External links
 Official website

 

Aerial tramways in Japan
1961 establishments in Japan